Thomas Troupkos (born 2 December 1973) is a retired Greek football striker.

References

1973 births
Living people
Greek footballers
Veria F.C. players
Kalamata F.C. players
Apollon Pontou FC players
Kavala F.C. players
Kastoria F.C. players
A.P.O. Akratitos Ano Liosia players
Doxa Drama F.C. players
Panachaiki F.C. players
Anagennisi Karditsa F.C. players
Naoussa F.C. players
Super League Greece players
Association football forwards
People from Imathia
Footballers from Central Macedonia